Sebastian B. is a German actor mainly known for his starring role as "Arnold Richter" in Alexander Tuschinski's Trilogy of Rebellion, consisting of the films  Menschenliebe, Break-Up and Timeless.

Filmography
Timeless (2016)
Break-Up (2014)
Mutant Calculator (2011) 
Menschenliebe (2010)

External links

Living people
Year of birth missing (living people)
German male film actors
Place of birth missing (living people)